Sokkan (also Romanized as Sokkān, Sekān, and Sokān; also known as Sokkūn and Sokūn) is a village in Emamzadeh Abdol Aziz Rural District, Jolgeh District, Isfahan County, Isfahan Province, Iran. At the 2006 census, its population was 132, in 34 families.

References 

Populated places in Isfahan County